Valentinas Antanavičius  (born 2 May 1936 in Kuklikiai, Lithuania) is a Lithuanian painter.
In 1992 he won a Lithuanian national arts award.

Biography
In 1962 he graduated from the Lithuanian Institute of Art. From 1962 he taught at the M. K. Čiurlionis arts school; also since 1988 the Vilnius Academy of Fine Arts.

He is a painter (portraits of cultural figures), and print-maker.
He is one of the most famous assemblage artists in Lithuania.
His works of the main character, constructed in the form of the human figure. He is a member of "Group 24".

Since 1962, he has held 15 solo exhibitions.

See also
List of Lithuanian painters

References

External links
juskus gallery
Valentinas Antanavičius

1936 births
Living people
People from Šakiai District Municipality
Lithuanian painters
Recipients of the Lithuanian National Prize